Raul Must (born November 9, 1987) is a badminton player from Estonia. He is a four time Olympian representing Estonia at the 2008 Beijing Olympics, 2012 London Olympics, 2016 Rio Olympics and also at the 2020 Tokyo Olympic Games.
Must was a men's singles bronze medalist at the 2019 Minsk European Games.

Career 
Must played the 2007 BWF World Championships in men's singles, and was defeated in the first round by Björn Joppien, of Germany, 21–12, 21–11.
Must also played the 2008 Olympic Games in men's singles, and was defeated in the first round by Przemysław Wacha, of Poland, 14–21, 15–21.  At the 2012 Summer Olympics, he did not qualify from the group round. Winning his group match against Austrian Michael Lahnsteiner with 21-14, 21-18, but losing the other group match against Indonesian Simon Santoso 12-21, 8-21. At the 2016 Rio Olympics he again won a groupsmatch, this time against Brice Leverdez from France with 21-18, 12-21, 21-18. But lost the other groups match against Dane Jan Ø. Jørgensen with 8-21, 15-21 so didn't advance further. For the 2020 Tokyo Olympics Must has been placed by draw in a group with Chen Long from China and Pablo Abián from Spain.

Achievements

European Games 
Men's singles

BWF Grand Prix (2 runners-up) 
The BWF Grand Prix has two levels, the BWF Grand Prix and Grand Prix Gold. It is a series of badminton tournaments sanctioned by the Badminton World Federation (BWF) since 2007.

Men's singles

  BWF Grand Prix Gold tournament
  BWF Grand Prix tournament

BWF International Challenge/Series (6 titles, 9 runners-up) 
Men's singles

  BWF International Challenge tournament
  BWF International Series tournament
  BWF Future Series tournament

References

External links 
 Raul Must Homepage
 
 

1987 births
Living people
Sportspeople from Tallinn
Estonian male badminton players
Badminton players at the 2008 Summer Olympics
Badminton players at the 2012 Summer Olympics
Badminton players at the 2016 Summer Olympics
Olympic badminton players of Estonia
Badminton players at the 2015 European Games
Badminton players at the 2019 European Games
European Games bronze medalists for Estonia
European Games medalists in badminton
Badminton players at the 2020 Summer Olympics